The Idrijca is a river flowing through the Idrija Hills and Cerkno Hills in Slovenia. It rises near Vojsko, flows towards northeast and after passing through Idrija turns to the northwest. After passing through Spodnja Idrija and Cerkno it joins the Soča in Most na Soči. It has a pluvio-nival regime and belongs to the Adriatic Sea Basin.

The major tributaries are the Belca, Zala, Cerknica, and Bača from the right and the Nikomlja, Kanošica, and Trebušica from the left. One of the right tributaries is also the Jezernica River, which originates from the Wild Lake. Being only 55 m long, the Jezernica is the shortest river in Slovenia.

The river has many fish, among which the Salmo marmoratus, the rainbow trout, and the Grayling are noteworthy. In the past, timber was driven down the Idrijca to Idrija to be used as pillars in the Idrija mercury mine. Special logging sluices (Sln. klavže) were employed for this purpose from the 17th until the 19th century.

The area of the upper Idrijca has been proclaimed the Upper Idrijca Landscape Park. It encompasses numerous karst features and diverse plant species. During World War II, Pavla Partisan Hospital stood there.

Tributaries
Senčni potok 
Nikova 
Kanomljica 
Otuška 
Sevnica 
Trebuščica 
Hotenja 
Črni potok  
Belca 
Zala 
Ljubevščica 
Zaspana grapa  
Skavnica 
Peklenska graba 
Grda grapa 
Luknjica 
Zaganjalčnica
Cerknica 
Jesenica 
Bukovška grapa 
Žibernik 
Doberšček 
Bača

References

External links
 
 Idrijca on Geopedia
 Condition of Idrijca - graphs, in the following order, of water level and flow for the past 30 days (taken in Podroteja by ARSO)

Rivers of the Slovene Littoral
Natura 2000 in Slovenia